The 2021 U.S. Open Pool Championship (previously U.S. Open 9-Ball Championship) was an international nine-ball pool tournament held from 13 to 18 September 2021 in Harrah’s Resort, Atlantic City, New Jersey. It was the 44th entry of the U.S. Open 9-Ball Championships, first held in 1976. Joshua Filler was the defending champion, having won the 2019 U.S. Open Nine-ball Championship. However, Filler lost 4–11 to Aloysius Yapp and 3–11 to Mieszko Fortuński, eliminating him from the tournament. Carlo Biado defeated Yapp 13–8 in the final to become of the few Filipino players to win the tournament along with Alex Pagulayan in 2005 and Efren Reyes in 1994.

Tournament format
The U.S. Open Pool Championship is a nine-ball pool tournament first held in 1976, won by Mike Sigel. It is pool's longest running major title. The 2021 tournament was played at Harrah’s Resort in Atlantic City from September 13–18, 2021. At that point it became a single-elimination tournament, as a race to 11 racks. The final was a race to 13 racks. Joshua Filler was the defending champion, having won the 2019 event, with the 2020 event having been cancelled due to the COVID-19 pandemic. Organized by Matchroom Sport, the event featured 256 participants playing on 33 tables, with entries to the event costing $750. The tournament was filled within 10 hours of signups opening. The event was broadcast on DAZN in the US and Canada as well as Germany, Spain and Italy; Sky Sports in the UK & Ireland; Viaplay in Scandinavia, Baltic Nations and Iceland); Zhibo.tv in China; and SuperSports in South Africa and Sub Saharan Africa.

Prize fund 
The tournament prize fund was a total of $300,000 with the winner receiving $50,000.

Summary

The double-elimination round was played from 13 to 17 September. The 2019 World Snooker Championship winner Judd Trump competed in his first pool event. He completed a 9–0 whitewash over Joe Magee in his first competitive match, followed by victories over Dhurav Patel 9–2 and Abdullah Al-Shammari 11–5. In the winners' third round, Trump met 2017 U.S. Open Pool Championship winner Jayson Shaw, who had defeated Hsieh Chia Chen in the prior round 11–10. Shaw  the opening rack, and won ten of the next eleven to win 11–1. Trump then lost 10–11 to Jason Theron in the losers' bracket to exit the tournament.

Defending champion Filler defeated Joseph Blyler 9–2, with his opponent applauding some of Filler's shots. However, Filler lost his third winners' round match to Aloysius Yapp 11–3.

The 2021 WPA World Nine-ball Championship winner Albin Ouschan completed a whitewash over Scott Haas on the first day, and progressed to the winners' qualifying round against Alexander Kazakis. Five-time winner Earl Strickland completed a 9–1 victory over Adam Martin, but lost to Alan Rosado in the losers bracket.

Main draw

Winners section

Section 1

Section 2

Section 3

Section 4

Section 5

Section 6

Section 7

Section 8

Losers section

Rounds 1–4

Rounds 5–8

Finals

References

External links
 
 

U.S Open 9-Ball championship
Sports competitions in Las Vegas
US Open
US Open
US Open
Sports competitions in Atlantic City, New Jersey
2021 in sports in New Jersey